Benjamin Bernard Haenow (born 6 January 1985) is a British singer-songwriter and former van driver. In 2014, he was crowned as the winner of the eleventh series of The X Factor UK after beating Fleur East. Following his win, his debut single, a cover of OneRepublic's "Something I Need", was released in December 2014. It debuted at number one on the UK Singles Chart, becoming the 2014 Christmas number one. Haenow released his self-titled debut studio album in November 2015, preceded by the single "Second Hand Heart", a duet with Kelly Clarkson.

Early years
Ben Haenow was born on 6 January 1985 in Croydon, England, to parents Mick and Rosanna Haenow (née Ward). He has an older brother named Alex. Their parents split when Ben was four years old, forcing his mother to work three jobs to make ends meet. When he was 14 years old, Ben suffered depression and drank a bottle of vodka a day until he was "sick and paralytic".

Haenow has sung in bands since he was 15 and formed the rock and roll band the Lost Audio with Alex in 2006. Before auditioning for The X Factor, he was employed as a van driver.

Career

2014: The X Factor and career beginnings

On 26 June 2014, Haenow auditioned in Newcastle for the eleventh series of The X Factor. After singing Bill Withers' "Ain't No Sunshine" in his room audition, he received four "yes" votes and progressed through to the arena auditions. He sang The Rolling Stones' "Wild Horses" at the arena and progressed to "bootcamp". Haenow was placed in the "Over 26s" category at "bootcamp" and was mentored by Simon Cowell. He successfully made it through to "judges' houses" and was later chosen by Cowell for the live shows, along with Jay James and eventual runner-up Fleur East (as well as eventual wildcard Stevi Ritchie).

Along with East, he was never in the bottom two and eventually made it to the live final. Haenow was announced as the winner on 14 December 2014. When the voting statistics were announced, Haenow was revealed to have received the most public votes from week four to ten.

On 15 December 2014, the day after he won the show, Haenow released his winner's single, a cover of OneRepublic's "Something I Need", via digital download. On 17 December, the single received a physical release, which features three of Haenow's best X Factor performances – "Jealous Guy", "Highway to Hell" and "Man in the Mirror". On 18 December, "Something I Need" entered the Irish Singles Chart at number two, finishing behind Mark Ronson's "Uptown Funk", making Haenow the first X Factor winner not to get Ireland's Christmas number one in nine years. On 21 December, the song debuted at number one on the UK Singles Chart ahead of "Uptown Funk", after selling 214,000 copies in its first week, and became the Christmas number one. The release also became the second-fastest selling single of the year, behind Band Aid 30's "Do They Know It's Christmas?", which sold nearly 313,000 copies in its first week back in November 2014.

2015–2016: Ben Haenow
On 6 January 2015, Haenow's 30th birthday, it was announced that he had been signed by Syco Music. He then spent several months of the year in Los Angeles recording his self-titled debut album, Ben Haenow, which was released on 13 November 2015. The lead single from the album, "Second Hand Heart", a duet with Kelly Clarkson, was released on 16 October 2015 and peaked at number 21. On 28 January 2016, Haenow confirmed that he and Syco had parted ways by way of mutual agreement.

2017–present: Alive 
Haenow released a new single "Alive" and on 7 July 2017. This was followed by "Forgive & Forget" on 13 October 2017 and "Rising" on 15 December 2017. Haenow revealed on his Facebook page that new single "Falling Down" would be released on 6 April 2018; he later announced on 3 May 2018 that his sophomore album, titled Alive, would be released on 25 May 2018.

Discography

Albums

Singles

Promotional singles

References

External links 
 
 
 Fan site

1985 births
Living people
English tenors
Game show contestants
People from Croydon
Singers from London
RCA Records artists
Syco Music artists
The X Factor winners
The X Factor (British TV series) winners
21st-century English singers
21st-century British male singers